The 2007 Rhode Island Rams football team was an American football team that represented the University of Rhode Island in the Colonial Athletic Association (CAA) during the 2007 NCAA Division I FCS football season. In their seventh and final season under head coach Tim Stowers, the Rams compiled a 3–8 record (2–6 against conference opponents) and tied for last place in the North Division of the CAA's North Division.

Schedule

References

Rhode Island
Rhode Island Rams football seasons
Rhode Island Rams football